Pameungpeuk is a small town near the coast of southwestern Java, Indonesia. 
It is located 131 kilometres by road south of Bandung.

Geography
The town is located several kilometres to the southeast of the small settlement of Cikelet, although it is Cikelet which is the administrative centre of the Cikelet District of the Garut Regency which Pameungpeuk is administered by. The smaller settlements of Mancagahar lie to the southwest, Mandalakasih to the east and Paas along the road to the north. The Kaso River flows past the village into the sea. A picturesque, twisting road is said to lead south from Garut with vegetable plots and tea plantations in the area. A bus service runs along this road from Garut. The road also connects the town to the Papandajan volcano. Pameungpeuk Bay and the white sandy beaches in the coastal area are described as "beautiful" and "stunning".

History

It contains the Puskesmas DTP Pameungpeuk Hospital and the Pameungpeuk Airfield and Space Center.  The airfield was the home base of 4V1G-VI Coastal Patrol Squadron, with Lockheed 212 planes. 

Indonesian soldiers took three Dutch soldiers prisoner at Pameungpeuk in 1947, when the American naval plane they were on was forced to land there after running out of fuel.

References

Populated places in West Java
Garut Regency